Elizabeth Cann (born 21 March 1979) is a badminton player from England. Cann started playing badminton along with many other sports at about age six, and was coached by her mother, Carmen. When she was 19, Cann moved to Denmark for three years to develop her badminton further, and started receiving formal technical coaching.

Achievements

Commonwealth Games 

Women's singles

BWF International Challenge/Series

References

External links
 

1979 births
Living people
Sportspeople from Surrey
English female badminton players
Commonwealth Games competitors for Jersey
Badminton players at the 1998 Commonwealth Games
Badminton players at the 2002 Commonwealth Games
Badminton players at the 2006 Commonwealth Games
Badminton players at the 2010 Commonwealth Games
Commonwealth Games bronze medallists for England
Commonwealth Games medallists in badminton
Badminton players at the 2014 Commonwealth Games
Jersey badminton players
Medallists at the 2010 Commonwealth Games